Danielle Marie Lao (born May 28, 1991) is an American professional tennis player.

She achieved a career-high WTA singles ranking of 152 on April 1, 2019, and has won three singles titles and three doubles titles on the ITF Circuit.

Junior and college career
Lao won the 2008 USTA National Open.
She competed for the USC Trojans where she was a two-time All-American and team captain.

Professional career
Lao plays primarily on the ITF Women's Circuit. In 2013, she co-authored a top-selling tennis book with Rick Limpert called The Invaluable Experience. In the book, Lao takes readers through her college tennis career and shows why playing a sport in college might be the best decision you could ever make.

Performance timelines

Only main-draw results in WTA Tour, Grand Slam tournaments and Olympic Games are included in win–loss records.

Singles

Doubles

ITF Circuit finals

Singles: 8 (4 titles, 4 runner–ups)

Doubles: 10 (3 titles, 7 runner–ups)

Notes

References

External links
 
 
 Official website
 USC Trojans profile

1991 births
Living people
American female tennis players
People from Pasadena, California
People from Arcadia, California
USC Trojans women's tennis players
Tennis people from California